Jacques Joseph Tissot (15 October 1836 – 8 August 1902), anglicized as James Tissot, was a French painter and illustrator. He was born to a drapery merchant and a milliner and decided to pursue a career in art at a young age, incorporating elements of realism, early Impressionism, and academic art into his work. He is best known for a variety of genre paintings of contemporary European high society produced during the peak of his career, with a focus on women's fashion and the Belle Epoque, but would also explore many Medieval, Biblical, and Japoniste subjects throughout his life.

Tissot served in the Franco-Prussian War on the side of France and later the Paris Commune before moving to London in 1871, where he would find further success as an artist as well as meet Irishwoman Kathleen Newton, who came to live with him as a close companion and muse until her death in 1882. Tissot maintained close relations with the then-nascent Impressionist movement, including friend and mentee Edgar Degas.

Early life
Jacques Tissot was born in the city of Nantes in France and spent his early childhood there. His father, Marcel Théodore Tissot, was a successful drapery merchant. His mother, Marie Durand, assisted her husband in the family business and designed hats. A devout Catholic, Tissot's mother instilled pious devotion in the future artist from a very young age. Tissot's youth spent in Nantes likely contributed to his frequent depiction of shipping vessels and boats in his later works. The involvement of his parents in the fashion industry is believed to have been an influence on his painting style, as he depicted women's clothing in fine detail. By the time Tissot was 17, he knew he wanted to pursue painting as a career. His father opposed this, preferring his son to follow a business profession, but the young Tissot gained his mother's support for his chosen vocation. Around this time, he began using the given name of James. By 1854 he was commonly known as James Tissot; he may have adopted it because of his increasing interest in everything English.

Early career

In 1856 or 1857, Tissot travelled to Paris to pursue an education in art. While staying with a friend of his mother, painter Jules-Élie Delaunay, Tissot enrolled at the Ecole des Beaux-Arts to study in the studios of Hippolyte Flandrin and Louis Lamothe. Both were successful Lyonnaise painters who moved to Paris to study under Jean-Auguste-Dominique Ingres. Lamothe provided the majority of Tissot's studio education, and the young artist studied on his own by copying works at the Louvre, as did most other artists of the time in their early years. Around this time, Tissot also made the acquaintance of the American James McNeill Whistler, and French painters Edgar Degas (who had also been a student of Lamothe and a friend of Delaunay), and Édouard Manet.

In 1859, Tissot exhibited in the Paris Salon for the first time. He showed five paintings of scenes from the Middle Ages, many depicting scenes from Goethe's Faust. These works show the influence in his work of the Belgian painter Henri Leys (Jan August Hendrik Leys), whom Tissot had met in Antwerp earlier that same year. Other influences include the works of the German painters Peter von Cornelius and Moritz Retzsch. After Tissot had first exhibited at the Salon and before he had been awarded a medal, the French government paid 5,000 francs for his depiction of The Meeting of Faust and Marguerite in 1860, with the painting being exhibited at the Salon the following year, together with a portrait and other paintings.

Mature life and career

Émile Péreire supplied Tissot's painting Walk in the Snow for the 1862 international exhibition in London; the next year three paintings by Tissot were displayed at the London gallery of Ernest Gambart. 

In about 1863, Tissot suddenly shifted his focus from the medieval style to the depiction of modern life through portraits. During this period, Tissot gained high critical acclaim, and quickly became a success as an artist. 

Tissot is considered a core figure of Japonisme alongside contemporaries such as Alfred Stevens and Claude Monet, a widespread artistic movement formed in response to the sudden influx of Japanese art, textiles, and curiosities into the European market as a result of the forced opening of trade relations with Japan in 1853 and subsequent Meiji Restoration in 1868. Tissot regularly included Japanese objects and costumes in his pictures and additionally expressed stylistic influences in his composition and angles. Degas painted a portrait of Tissot from these years (Metropolitan Museum of Art, New York), in which he is sitting below a Japanese screen hanging on the wall.

Tissot led a tumultuous life outside of painting, fighting in the Franco-Prussian War as part of the improvised defence of Paris first joining two companies of the Garde Nationale and later as part of the Paris Commune. His 1870 painting La Partie Carrée (The Foursome) evoked the period of the French revolution. Either because of the radical political associations related to the Paris Commune (which he was believed to have joined mostly to protect his own belongings rather than for shared ideology), or because of better opportunities, he left Paris for London in 1871. During this period, Seymour Haden helped him to learn etching techniques. Having already worked as a caricaturist for Thomas Gibson Bowles, the owner of the magazine Vanity Fair, as well as exhibited at the Royal Academy, Tissot arrived with established social and artistic connections in London. Tissot used the name Coïdé in Vanity Fair from 1869 to 1873.

Tissot quickly developed his reputation as a painter of elegantly dressed women shown in scenes of fashionable life, influenced by his millinery childhood. By 1872 Tissot had bought a house in St John's Wood, an area of London very popular with artists at the time. According to The Oxford Dictionary of Art and Artists, "in 1874 Edmond de Goncourt wrote sarcastically that he had 'a studio with a waiting room where, at all times, there is iced champagne at the disposal of visitors'".

Tissot gained membership of The Arts Club in 1873, and his paintings appealed greatly to wealthy British industrialists throughout the second half of the 19th century. During 1872 he earned 94,515 francs, an income normally only enjoyed by those in the echelons of the upper classes.

In 1874, Degas asked him to join them in the first exhibition organized by the artists who became known as the Impressionists, a then-nascent artistic movement that would influence Tissot's own style, but he ultimately refused despite remaining close to these artists. Berthe Morisot visited him in London in 1874, and he travelled to Venice with Édouard Manet at about the same time. He regularly saw Whistler, who influenced Tissot's Thames river scenes.

In 1875 or 1876, Tissot met Kathleen Newton, a divorcee who became the painter's companion and frequent model. He composed an etching of her in 1876 entitled Portrait of Mrs N., more commonly titled . She gave birth to a son, Cecil George Newton in 1876, who is believed to be Tissot's. She moved into Tissot's household in St. John's Wood in 1876 and lived with him until her death in the late stages of consumption in 1882. Tissot frequently referred to these years with Newton as the happiest of his life, a time when he was able to live out his dream of a family life.

After Kathleen Newton's death, Tissot returned to Paris. A major exhibition of his work took place in 1885 at the Galerie Sedelmeyer, where he showed 15 large paintings in a series called . Unlike the genre scenes of fashionable women he painted in London, these paintings represent different types and classes of women, shown in professional and social scenes. The series also solidified the influence of Japanese prints in Tissot's work, as he used unexpected angles and framing from that tradition.

Late career

In 1885, Tissot had a revival of his Catholic faith, which led him to spend the rest of his life making paintings about biblical events. Many of his artist friends were skeptical about his conversion, which coincided with the French Catholic revival, a reaction against the secular attitude of the French Third Republic. Moving away from the Impressionism and Post-Impressionism, who aimed to create art that reflected a changing, modern world, Tissot returned to traditional, representational styles and narratives in his watercolors. To assist in his completion of biblical illustrations, Tissot traveled to the Middle East in 1886, 1889, and 1896 to make studies of the landscape and people. His series of 365 gouache illustrations showing the life of Christ were shown to critical acclaim and enthusiastic audiences in Paris (1894–1895), London (1896) and New York (1898–1899), before being bought by the Brooklyn Museum in 1900. They were published in a French edition in 1896–1897 and in an English one in 1897–1898, bringing Tissot vast wealth and fame. During July 1894, Tissot was awarded the Legion of Honour, France's most prestigious medal.

Tissot spent the last years of his life working on paintings of subjects from the Old Testament. Although he never completed the series, he exhibited 80 of these paintings in Paris in 1901 and engravings after them were published in 1904.

Death and legacy
Tissot died suddenly in Doubs, France, on 8 August 1902, while living in the Château de Buillon, a former abbey which he had inherited from his father in 1888. His grave is in the chapel sited within the grounds of the chateau. Widespread use of his illustrations in literature and slides continued after his death with The Life of Christ and The Old Testament becoming the "definitive Bible images". In 1906, filmmaker Alice Guy-Blaché used the Tissot Bible as reference material for her largest production at Gaumont to date, The Passion, creating twenty-five episodes, with approximately three hundred extras. His images provided a foundation for contemporary films such as the design for the Ark of the Covenant in Raiders of the Lost Ark (1981) and lifestyle themes in The Age of Innocence (1993). In the first half of the 20th century, there was a re-kindling of interest in his portraits of fashionable ladies and some fifty years later, these were achieving record prices.

Gallery

See also
 List of Orientalist artists
 Orientalism

References

Citations

General sources 

 Biography of Tissot with recent information on Kathleen Newton
 Misfeldt, Willard E. "Tissot, James [Jacques-Joseph]" in Oxford Art Online.
 Wentworth, Michael. "James Tissot." Oxford: Clarendon Press, 1984. Print
 Wood, Christopher. "Tissot: Life and Work of Jacques Joseph Tissot 1836–1902." London: Weidenfeld and Nicolson, 1986. Print.

External links

 209 works by James Tissot at www.JamesTissot.org
 James Tissot: The Life Of Christ. Exhibition at Brooklyn Museum 2009 
 Commentary on Tissot's etching of Kathleen Newton
Commentary on a portrait of Mrs. Newton
  
 Biblical art by James Tissot
 Degas: The Artist's Mind, exhibition catalog from The Metropolitan Museum of Art fully available online as PDF, which contains material on James Tissot (see index)

1836 births
1902 deaths
19th-century French painters
French expatriates in the United Kingdom
French male painters
French military personnel of the Franco-Prussian War
Orientalist painters
Artists from Nantes
Vanity Fair (British magazine) artists
19th-century French male artists